Gotta Get Out may refer to:
"Gotta Get Out", a song by Alec Empire from the album Futurist
"Gotta Get Out", a song by the Bicycles from the album The Good, the Bad and the Cuddly
"Gotta Get Out", a song by Endeverafter from the album Kiss or Kill